The Ministry of Transportation and Roads Development of the Republic of Somaliland (MoTRD)  is a member of the Somaliland cabinet which is  concerned with transportation and roads. It is responsible for meeting the transportation needs of the country, whether by sea, land or air.
The current minister is Abdillahi Abokor Osman.

Ministers of Transportation

See also
 Politics of Somaliland
 Cabinet of Somaliland

References

External links
Official Site of the Government of Somaliland

Politics of Somaliland
Government ministries of Somaliland
Issa Musa